Dinu Mihail Pescariu (born 12 April 1974) is a former tennis player from Romania, who turned professional in 1991. The right-hander represented his native country at two Summer Olympics: in Barcelona (1992) and in Atlanta (1996). He reached his highest singles ATP-ranking on 6 August 1998, when he became the number 75 of the world.

ATP career finals

Doubles: 3 (1 title, 2 runners-up)

Performance timeline

Singles

ATP Challenger and ITF Futures finals

Singles: 14 (9–5)

Doubles: 11 (5–6)

Controversy
On 10 October 2017, the Romanian National Anticorruption Directorate announced that Dinu Pescariu will be prosecuted in the file of taking over ‘Cutezatorii’ sports base in Bucharest. He is being investigated, under judicial control, for taking over the sports base illegally and reportedly paying a much smaller rental fee for it than the market rate.

References

  (English translation)

External links
 
 
 
 
 

1974 births
Hopman Cup competitors
Living people
Olympic tennis players of Romania
Tennis players from Bucharest
Romanian male tennis players
Tennis players at the 1992 Summer Olympics
Tennis players at the 1996 Summer Olympics